Johannes Ngodzo (born 6 November 1980) is probably the most skillful player to ever play for Highlanders Football club. He is a retired Zimbabwean football midfielder. Ngodzo was the 2001 Soccer Star of the year runner up behind Captain & team mate Dazidelio Kapenya popularly known as Walker the Texas Ranger. Ngodzo was affectionately know as Signature by the Highlanders fans. The Highlanders fans reconned that when he rolled the ball back and forth he will be writing his signature J. Ngodzo. One staunch Highlanders fan by the name Mthabisi Sibanda loved to say in a Zimbabwean dialect, “Ongabonanga uNgodzo Kabonanga ibhora” which is loosely translated “he who did not see Johannes Ngodzo play, has never experienced real football. Johannes Ngodzo won the Zimbabwean Premier League 4 times with Highlanders football club among other cup competitions. He is currently coaching Real Betis Academy in Bulawayo, Zimbabwe

References

1980 births
Living people
Zimbabwean footballers
Zimbabwe international footballers
Highlanders F.C. players
Bantu Tshintsha Guluva Rovers F.C. players
Association football midfielders